Ramsey, New Jersey was incorporated as a borough by an act of the New Jersey Legislature on March 10, 1908, from portions of Hohokus Township (whose remnants are now Mahwah Township). Additional territory was annexed from Waldwick in 1921, and portions of the borough were ceded to Saddle River in 1925.

Mayors

Table Data Source

References

Lists of mayors of places in New Jersey